Italian (italiano  or  ) is a Romance language of the Indo-European language family that evolved from the Vulgar Latin of the Roman Empire. Together with Sardinian, Italian is the least divergent language from Latin. Spoken by about 85 million people (2022), Italian is an official language in Italy, Switzerland (Ticino and the Grisons), San Marino, and Vatican City. It has official minority status in Croatia and in some areas of Slovenian Istria. 

Italian is also spoken by large immigrant and expatriate communities in the Americas and Australia. Italian is included under the languages covered by the European Charter for Regional or Minority Languages in Bosnia and Herzegovina and in Romania, although Italian is neither a co-official nor a protected language in these countries. Many speakers of Italian are native bilinguals of both Italian (either in its standard form or regional varieties) and a local language of Italy, most frequently the language spoken at home in their place of origin.

Italian is a major language in Europe, being one of the official languages of the Organization for Security and Co-operation in Europe and one of the working languages of the Council of Europe. It is the second-most-widely spoken native language in the European Union with 67 million speakers (15% of the EU population) and it is spoken as a second language by 13.4 million EU citizens (3%). Including Italian speakers in non-EU European countries (such as Switzerland, Albania and the United Kingdom) and on other continents, the total number of speakers is approximately 85 million. Italian is the main working language of the Holy See, serving as the lingua franca (common language) in the Roman Catholic hierarchy as well as the official language of the Sovereign Military Order of Malta. Italian has a significant use in musical terminology and opera with numerous Italian words referring to music that have become international terms taken into various languages worldwide. Italian was adopted by the state after the Unification of Italy, having previously been a literary language based on Tuscan as spoken mostly by the upper class of Florentine society. Almost all native Italian words end with vowels and has a 7-vowel sound system ('e' and 'o' have mid-low and mid-high sounds). Italian has contrast between short and long consonants and gemination (doubling) of consonants.

History

Origins 

During the Middle Ages, the established written language in Europe was Latin, though the great majority of people were illiterate, and only a handful were well versed in the language. In the Italian Peninsula, as in most of Europe, most would instead speak a local vernacular. These dialects, as they are commonly referred to, evolved from Vulgar Latin over the course of centuries, unaffected by formal standards and teachings. They are not in any sense "dialects" of standard Italian, which itself started off as one of these local tongues, but sister languages of Italian. Mutual intelligibility with Italian varies widely, as it does with Romance languages in general. The Romance languages of Italy can differ greatly from Italian at all levels (phonology, morphology, syntax, lexicon, pragmatics) and are classified typologically as distinct languages.

The standard Italian language has a poetic and literary origin in the writings of Tuscan and Sicilian writers of the 12th century, and, even though the grammar and core lexicon are basically unchanged from those used in Florence in the 13th century, the modern standard of the language was largely shaped by relatively recent events. However, Romance vernacular as language spoken in the Italian Peninsula has a longer history. In fact, the earliest surviving texts that can definitely be called vernacular (as distinct from its predecessor Vulgar Latin) are legal formulae known as the Placiti Cassinesi from the Province of Benevento that date from 960 to 963, although the Veronese Riddle, probably from the 8th or early 9th century, contains a late form of Vulgar Latin that can be seen as a very early sample of a vernacular dialect of Italy. The Commodilla catacomb inscription is also a similar case.

The Italian language has progressed through a long and slow process, which started after the Western Roman Empire's fall in the 5th century.

The language that came to be thought of as Italian developed in central Tuscany and was first formalized in the early 14th century through the works of Tuscan writer Dante Alighieri, written in his native Florentine. Dante is still credited with standardizing the Italian language. In addition to the widespread exposure gained through literature, the Florentine dialect also gained prestige due to the political and cultural significance of Florence at the time and the fact that it was linguistically an intermediate between the northern and the southern Italian dialects. Thus the dialect of Florence became the basis for what would become the official language of Italy.

Italian was progressively made an official language of most of the Italian states predating unification, slowly replacing Latin, even when ruled by foreign powers (like Spain in the Kingdom of Naples, or Austria in the Kingdom of Lombardy–Venetia), even though the masses kept speaking primarily their local vernaculars. Italian was also one of the many recognised languages in the Austro-Hungarian Empire.

Italy has always had a distinctive dialect for each city because the cities, until recently, were thought of as city-states. Those dialects now have considerable variety. As Tuscan-derived Italian came to be used throughout Italy, features of local speech were naturally adopted, producing various versions of Regional Italian. The most characteristic differences, for instance, between Roman Italian and Milanese Italian are syntactic gemination of initial consonants in some contexts and the pronunciation of stressed "e", and of "s" between vowels in many words: e.g.

In contrast to the Gallo-Italic linguistic panorama of Northern Italy, the Italo-Dalmatian, Neapolitan and its related dialects were largely unaffected by the Franco-Occitan influences introduced to Italy mainly by bards from France during the Middle Ages, but after the Norman conquest of southern Italy, Sicily became the first Italian land to adopt Occitan lyric moods (and words) in poetry. Even in the case of Northern Italian languages, however, scholars are careful not to overstate the effects of outsiders on the natural indigenous developments of the languages.

The economic might and relatively advanced development of Tuscany at the time (Late Middle Ages) gave its language weight, though Venetian remained widespread in medieval Italian commercial life, and Ligurian (or Genoese) remained in use in maritime trade alongside the Mediterranean. The increasing political and cultural relevance of Florence during the periods of the rise of the Medici Bank, humanism, and the Renaissance made its dialect, or rather a refined version of it, a standard in the arts.

Renaissance 

During this time, long-existing beliefs stemming from the teachings of the Roman Catholic Church began to be understood from new perspectives as humanists—individuals who placed emphasis on the human body and its full potential—began to shift focus from the church to human beings themselves. The continual advancements in technology play a crucial role in the diffusion of languages. After the invention of the printing press in the fifteenth century, the number of printing presses in Italy grew rapidly and by the year 1500 reached a total of 56, the biggest number of printing presses in all of Europe. This enabled the production of more pieces of literature at a lower cost and as the dominant language, Italian, spread.

Italian became the language used in the courts of every state in the Italian Peninsula, as well as the prestige variety used on the island of Corsica (but not in the neighbouring Sardinia, which on the contrary underwent Italianization well into the late 18th century, under Savoyard sway: the island's linguistic composition, roofed by the prestige of Spanish among the Sardinians, would therein make for a rather slow process of assimilation to the Italian cultural sphere). The rediscovery of Dante's , as well as a renewed interest in linguistics in the 16th century, sparked a debate that raged throughout Italy concerning the criteria that should govern the establishment of a modern Italian literary and spoken language. Renaissance scholars divided into three main factions:
 The purists, headed by Venetian Pietro Bembo (who, in his , claimed the language might be based only on the great literary classics, such as Petrarch and some part of Boccaccio). The purists thought the Divine Comedy was not dignified enough because it used elements from non-lyric registers of the language.
 Niccolò Machiavelli and other Florentines preferred the version spoken by ordinary people in their own times.
 The courtiers, like Baldassare Castiglione and Gian Giorgio Trissino, insisted that each local vernacular contribute to the new standard.

A fourth faction claimed that the best Italian was the one that the papal court adopted, which was a mixture of the Tuscan and Roman dialects.

Modern era 
An important event that helped the diffusion of Italian was the conquest and occupation of Italy by Napoleon in the early 19th century (who was himself of Italian-Corsican descent). This conquest propelled the unification of Italy some decades after and pushed the Italian language into a lingua franca used not only among clerks, nobility, and functionaries in the Italian courts but also by the bourgeoisie.

Contemporary times 

Italian literature's first modern novel,  (The Betrothed) by Alessandro Manzoni, further defined the standard by "rinsing" his Milanese "in the waters of the Arno" (Florence's river), as he states in the preface to his 1840 edition.

After unification, a huge number of civil servants and soldiers recruited from all over the country introduced many more words and idioms from their home languages— is derived from the Venetian word  ("slave", that is "your servant"),  comes from the Lombard word , etc. Only 2.5% of Italy's population could speak the Italian standardized language properly when the nation was unified in 1861.

Classification 
Italian is a Romance language, a descendant of Vulgar Latin (colloquial spoken Latin). Standard Italian is based on Tuscan, especially its Florentine dialect, and is, therefore, an Italo-Dalmatian language, a classification that includes most other central and southern Italian languages and the extinct Dalmatian.

According to Ethnologue, lexical similarity is 89% with French, 87% with Catalan, 85% with Sardinian, 82% with Spanish, 80% with Portuguese, 78% with Ladin, 77% with Romanian. Estimates may differ according to sources.

One study, analyzing the degree of differentiation of Romance languages in comparison to Latin (comparing phonology, inflection, discourse, syntax, vocabulary, and intonation), estimated that distance between Italian and Latin is higher than that between Sardinian and Latin. In particular, its vowels are the second-closest to Latin after Sardinian. As in most Romance languages, stress is distinctive.

Geographic distribution 

Italian is an official language of Italy and San Marino and is spoken fluently by the majority of the countries' populations. Italian is the third most spoken language in Switzerland (after German and French), though its use there has moderately declined since the 1970s. It is official both on the national level and on regional level in two cantons: Ticino and the Grisons. In the latter canton, however, it is only spoken by a small minority, in the Italian Grisons. Ticino, which includes Lugano, the largest Italian-speaking city outside Italy, is the only canton where Italian is predominant. Italian is also used in administration and official documents in Vatican City. 

Italian is also spoken by a minority in Monaco and France, especially in the southeastern part of the country. Italian was the official language in Savoy and in Nice until 1860, when they were both annexed by France under the Treaty of Turin, a development that triggered the "Niçard exodus", or the emigration of a quarter of the Niçard Italians to Italy, and the Niçard Vespers. Italian was the official language of Corsica until 1859. Italian is generally understood in Corsica by the population resident therein who speak Corsican, which is an Italo-Romance idiom similar to Tuscan. Italian was the official language in Monaco until 1860, when it was replaced by the French. This was due to the annexation of the surrounding County of Nice to France following the Treaty of Turin (1860).

It formerly had official status in Montenegro (because of the Venetian Albania), parts of Slovenia and Croatia (because of the Venetian Istria and Venetian Dalmatia), parts of Greece (because of the Venetian rule in the Ionian Islands and by the Kingdom of Italy in the Dodecanese). Italian is widely spoken in Malta, where nearly two-thirds of the population can speak it fluently. Italian served as Malta's official language until 1934, when it was abolished by the British colonial administration amid strong local opposition. Italian language in Slovenia is an officially recognized minority language in the country. The official census, carried out in 2002, reported 2,258 ethnic Italians (Istrian Italians) in Slovenia (0.11% of the total population). Italian language in Croatia is an official minority language in the country, with many schools and public announcements published in both languages. The 2001 census in Croatia reported 19,636 ethnic Italians (Istrian Italians and Dalmatian Italians) in the country (some 0.42% of the total population). Their numbers dropped dramatically after World War II following the Istrian–Dalmatian exodus, which caused the emigration of between 230,000 and 350,000 Istrian Italians and Dalmatian Italians. Italian was the official language of the Republic of Ragusa from 1492 to 1807.

It formerly had official status in Albania due to the annexation of the country to the Kingdom of Italy (1939–1943). Albania has a large population of non-native speakers, with over half of the population having some knowledge of the Italian language. The Albanian government has pushed to make Italian a compulsory second language in schools. The Italian language is well-known and studied in Albania, due to its historical ties and geographical proximity to Italy and to the diffusion of Italian television in the country. 

Due to heavy Italian influence during the Italian colonial period, Italian is still understood by some in former colonies such as in Libya. Although it was the primary language in Libya since colonial rule, Italian greatly declined under the rule of Muammar Gaddafi, who expelled the Italian Libyan population and made Arabic the sole official language of the country. A few hundred Italian settlers returned to Libya in the 2000s.

Italian was the official language of Eritrea during Italian colonisation. Italian is today used in commerce, and it is still spoken especially among elders; besides that, Italian words are incorporated as loan words in the main language spoken in the country (Tigrinya). The capital city of Eritrea, Asmara, still has several Italian schools, established during the colonial period. In the early 19th century, Eritrea was the country with the highest number of Italians abroad, and the Italian Eritreans grew from 4,000 during World War I to nearly 100,000 at the beginning of World War II. In Asmara there are two Italian schools, the Italian School of Asmara (Italian primary school with a Montessori department) and the Liceo Sperimentale "G. Marconi" (Italian international senior high school).

Italian was also introduced to Somalia through colonialism and was the sole official language of administration and education during the colonial period but fell out of use after government, educational and economic infrastructure were destroyed in the Somali Civil War.

Italian is also spoken by large immigrant and expatriate communities in the Americas and Australia. Although over 17 million Americans are of Italian descent, only a little over one million people in the United States speak Italian at home. Nevertheless, an Italian language media market does exist in the country. In Canada, Italian is the second most spoken non-official language when varieties of Chinese are not grouped together, with 375,645 claiming Italian as their mother tongue in 2016.

Italian immigrants to South America have also brought a presence of the language to that continent. According to some sources, Italian is the second most spoken language in Argentina after the official language of Spanish, although its number of speakers, mainly of the older generation, is decreasing. Italian bilingual speakers can be found scattered across the Southeast of Brazil as well as in the South, In Venezuela, Italian is the most spoken language after Spanish and Portuguese, with around 200,000 speakers. In Uruguay, people that speak Italian as their home language is 1.1% of the total population of the country. In Australia, Italian is the second most spoken foreign language after Chinese, with 1.4% of the population speaking it as their home language.

The main Italian-language newspapers published outside Italy are the L'Osservatore Romano (Vatican City), the L'Informazione di San Marino (San Marino), the Corriere del Ticino and the laRegione Ticino (Switzerland), the La Voce del Popolo (Croatia), the Corriere d'Italia (Germany), the L'italoeuropeo (United Kingdom), the Passaparola (Luxembourg), the America Oggi (United States), the Corriere Canadese and the Corriere Italiano (Canada), the Il punto d'incontro (Mexico), the L'Italia del Popolo (Argentina), the Fanfulla (Brazil), the Gente d'Italia (Uruguay), the La Voce d'Italia (Venezuela), the Il Globo (Australia) and the La gazzetta del Sud Africa (South Africa).

Education 
Italian is widely taught in many schools around the world, but rarely as the first foreign language. In the 21st century, technology also allows for the continual spread of the Italian language, as people have new ways to learn how to speak, read, and write languages at their own pace and at any given time. For example, the free website and application Duolingo has 4.94 million English speakers learning the Italian language.

According to the Italian Ministry of Foreign Affairs, every year there are more than 200,000 foreign students who study the Italian language; they are distributed among the 90 Institutes of Italian Culture that are located around the world, in the 179 Italian schools located abroad, or in the 111 Italian lecturer sections belonging to foreign schools where Italian is taught as a language of culture.

As of 2022, Australia had the highest number of students learning Italian in the world. This occurred because of support by the Italian community in Australia and the Italian Government and also because of successful educational reform efforts led by local governments in Australia.

Influence and derived languages 

From the late 19th to the mid-20th century, thousands of Italians settled in Argentina, Uruguay, Southern Brazil and Venezuela, as well as in Canada and the United States, where they formed a physical and cultural presence.

In some cases, colonies were established where variants of regional languages of Italy were used, and some continue to use this regional language. Examples are Rio Grande do Sul, Brazil, where Talian is used, and the town of Chipilo near Puebla, Mexico; each continues to use a derived form of Venetian dating back to the nineteenth century. Another example is Cocoliche, an Italian–Spanish pidgin once spoken in Argentina and especially in Buenos Aires, and Lunfardo.

Lingua franca 

Starting in late medieval times in much of Europe and the Mediterranean, Latin was replaced as the primary commercial language by Italian language variants (especially Tuscan and Venetian). These variants were consolidated during the Renaissance with the strength of Italy and the rise of humanism and the arts.

During that period, Italy held artistic sway over the rest of Europe. It was the norm for all educated gentlemen to make the Grand Tour, visiting Italy to see its great historical monuments and works of art. It thus became expected to learn at least some Italian. In England, while the classical languages Latin and Greek were the first to be learned, Italian became the second most common modern language after French, a position it held until the late 18th century when it tended to be replaced by German. John Milton, for instance, wrote some of his early poetry in Italian.

Within the Catholic Church, Italian is known by a large part of the ecclesiastical hierarchy and is used in substitution for Latin in some official documents.

Italian loanwords continue to be used in most languages in matters of art and music (especially classical music including opera), in the design and fashion industries, in some sports like football and especially in culinary terms.

Languages and dialects 

In Italy, almost all the other languages spoken as the vernacular—other than standard Italian and some languages spoken among immigrant communities—are often called "Italian dialects", a label that can be very misleading if it is understood to mean "dialects of Italian". The Romance dialects of Italy are local evolutions of spoken Latin that pre-date the establishment of Italian, and as such are sister languages to the Tuscan that was the historical source of Italian. They can be quite different from Italian and from each other, with some belonging to different linguistic branches of Romance. The only exceptions to this are twelve groups considered "historical language minorities", which are officially recognized as distinct minority languages by the law. On the other hand, Corsican (a language spoken on the French island of Corsica) is closely related to medieval Tuscan, from which Standard Italian derives and evolved.

The differences in the evolution of Latin in the different regions of Italy can be attributed to the natural changes that all languages in regular use are subject to, and to some extent to the presence of three other types of languages: substrata, superstrata, and adstrata. The most prevalent were substrata (the language of the original inhabitants), as the Italian dialects were most likely simply Latin as spoken by native cultural groups. Superstrata and adstrata were both less important. Foreign conquerors of Italy that dominated different regions at different times left behind little to no influence on the dialects. Foreign cultures with which Italy engaged in peaceful relations with, such as trade, had no significant influence either.

Throughout Italy, regional variations of Standard Italian, called Regional Italian, are spoken. Regional differences can be recognized by various factors: the openness of vowels, the length of the consonants, and influence of the local language (for example, in informal situations ,  and  replace the standard Italian  in the area of Tuscany, Rome and Venice respectively for the infinitive "to go").

There is no definitive date when the various Italian variants of Latin—including varieties that contributed to modern Standard Italian—began to be distinct enough from Latin to be considered separate languages. One criterion for determining that two language variants are to be considered separate languages rather than variants of a single language is that they have evolved so that they are no longer mutually intelligible; this diagnostic is effective if mutual intelligibility is minimal or absent (e.g. in Romance, Romanian and Portuguese), but it fails in cases such as Spanish-Portuguese or Spanish-Italian, as educated native speakers of either pairing can understand each other well if they choose to do so; however, the level of intelligibility is markedly lower between Italian-Spanish, and considerably higher between the Iberian sister languages of Portuguese-Spanish. Speakers of this latter pair can communicate with one another with remarkable ease, each speaking to the other in his own native language without slang/jargon. Nevertheless, on the basis of accumulated differences in morphology, syntax, phonology, and to some extent lexicon, it is not difficult to identify that for the Romance varieties of Italy, the first extant written evidence of languages that can no longer be considered Latin comes from the ninth and tenth centuries C.E. These written sources demonstrate certain vernacular characteristics and sometimes explicitly mention the use of the vernacular in Italy. Full literary manifestations of the vernacular began to surface around the 13th century in the form of various religious texts and poetry.Although these are the first written records of Italian varieties separate from Latin, the spoken language had likely diverged long before the first written records appear, since those who were literate generally wrote in Latin even if they spoke other Romance varieties in person.

Throughout the 19th and 20th centuries, the use of Standard Italian became increasingly widespread and was mirrored by a decline in the use of the dialects. An increase in literacy was one of the main driving factors (one can assume that only literates were capable of learning Standard Italian, whereas those who were illiterate had access only to their native dialect). The percentage of literates rose from 25% in 1861 to 60% in 1911, and then on to 78.1% in 1951. Tullio De Mauro, an Italian linguist, has asserted that in 1861 only 2.5% of the population of Italy could speak Standard Italian. He reports that in 1951 that percentage had risen to 87%. The ability to speak Italian did not necessarily mean it was in everyday use, and most people (63.5%) still usually spoke their native dialects. In addition, other factors such as mass emigration, industrialization, and urbanization, and internal migrations after World War II, contributed to the proliferation of Standard Italian. The Italians who emigrated during the Italian diaspora beginning in 1861 were often of the uneducated lower class, and thus the emigration had the effect of increasing the percentage of literates, who often knew and understood the importance of Standard Italian, back home in Italy. A large percentage of those who had emigrated also eventually returned to Italy, often more educated than when they had left.

The Italian dialects have declined in the modern era, as Italy unified under Standard Italian and continues to do so aided by mass media, from newspapers to radio to television.

Phonology 

Compared with most other Romance languages, Italian phonology is conservative, preserving many words nearly unchanged from Vulgar Latin. Some examples:
 Italian  "fourteen" < Latin  (cf. Spanish , French  , Catalan and Portuguese )
 Italian settimana "week" < Latin  (cf. Romanian săptămână, Spanish and Portuguese semana, French semaine , Catalan setmana)
 Italian medesimo "same" < Vulgar Latin * (cf. Spanish mismo, Portuguese mesmo, French même , Catalan mateix; note that Italian usually prefers the shorter stesso)
 Italian guadagnare "to win, earn, gain" < Vulgar Latin * < Germanic  (cf. Spanish ganar, Portuguese ganhar, French gagner , Catalan guanyar)

The conservative nature of Italian phonology is partly explained by its origin. Italian stems from a literary language that is derived from the 13th-century speech of the city of Florence in the region of Tuscany, and has changed little in the last 700 years or so.

The following are some of the conservative phonological features of Italian, as compared with the common Western Romance languages (French, Spanish, Portuguese, Galician, Catalan). Some of these features are also present in Romanian.
 Little or no phonemic lenition of consonants between vowels, e.g.  > vita "life" (cf. Romanian vită, Spanish vida , French vie),  > piede "foot" (cf. Spanish pie, French pied ).
 Preservation of geminate consonants, e.g.  >   "year" (cf. Spanish  , French  , Romanian , Portuguese  ).
 Preservation of all Proto-Romance final vowels, e.g.  >  "peace" (cf. Romanian , Spanish , French  ),  >  "eight" (cf. Romanian , Spanish , French  ),  >  "I did" (cf. Romanian dialectal , Spanish , French  ).
 Preservation of most intertonic vowels (those between the stressed syllable and either the beginning or ending syllable). This accounts for some of the most noticeable differences, as in the forms quattordici and settimana given above.
 Slower consonant development, e.g.  > Italo-Western  > foglia  "leaf" (cf. Romanian foaie , Spanish hoja , French feuille ; but note Portuguese folha ).

Compared with most other Romance languages, Italian has many inconsistent outcomes, where the same underlying sound produces different results in different words, e.g.  > lasciare and lassare,  > cacciare and cazzare,  > sdrucciolare, druzzolare and ruzzolare,  > regina and reina. Although in all these examples the second form has fallen out of usage, the dimorphism is thought to reflect the several-hundred-year period during which Italian developed as a literary language divorced from any native-speaking population, with an origin in 12th/13th-century Tuscan but with many words borrowed from languages farther to the north, with different sound outcomes. Dual outcomes of Latin /p t k/ between vowels, such as  > luogo but  > fuoco, was once thought to be due to borrowing of northern voiced forms, but is now generally viewed as the result of early phonetic variation within Tuscany.

Some other features that distinguish Italian from the Western Romance languages:
Spanish ocho, French huit, Portuguese oito).
 Vulgar Latin  becomes cchi  rather than :  > occhio "eye" (cf. Portuguese olho , French œil  < ); but Romanian ochi .
Romanian amic, amici and amică, amice; Spanish amigo(s) "male friend(s)", amiga(s) "female friend(s)");  → tre, sei "three, six" (cf. Romanian trei, șase; Spanish tres, seis).

Standard Italian also differs in some respects from most nearby Italian languages:
 Perhaps most noticeable is the total lack of metaphony, though metaphony is a feature characterizing nearly every other Italian language.
 No simplification of original ,  (which often became  elsewhere).

Assimilation 
Italian phonotactics do not usually permit verbs and polysyllabic nouns to end with consonants, except in poetry and song, so foreign words may receive extra terminal vowel sounds.

Writing system 

Italian has a shallow orthography, meaning very regular spelling with an almost one-to-one correspondence between letters and sounds. In linguistic terms, the writing system is close to being a phonemic orthography. The most important of the few exceptions are the following (see below for more details): 
 The letter c represents the sound  at the end of words and before the letters a, o, and u but represents the sound  (as the first sound in the English word chair) before the letters e and i.
 The letter g represents the sound  at the end of words and before the letters a, o, and u but represents the sound  (as the first sound in the English word gem) before the letters e and i. 
The letter q represents /k/ pronounced [k], thus n also represents [ŋ] in the position preceding it: cinque [ˈt͡ʃiŋkwe]. Elsewhere the letter n represents /n/ pronounced [n], including before the affricates /t͡ʃ/ or /d͡ʒ/ (equivalent to the consonants of English church and judge) spelled with c or g before the letters i and e : mancia [ˈmant͡ʃa], mangia [ˈmand͡ʒa].  
 The letter h is always silent: hotel /oˈtɛl/; hanno 'they have' and anno 'year' both represent /ˈanno/. It is used to form a digraph with c or g to represent /k/ or /g/ before i or e: chi /ki/ 'who', che /ke/ 'what'; aghi /ˈagi/ 'needles', ghetto /ˈgetto/. 
 The spellings ci and gi represent only /tʃ/ (as in English church) or /dʒ/ (as in English judge) with no /i/ sound before another vowel (ciuccio /ˈtʃuttʃo/ 'pacifier', Giorgio /ˈdʒɔrdʒo/) unless c or g precede stressed /i/ (farmacia /farmaˈtʃia/ 'pharmacy', biologia /bioloˈdʒia/ 'biology'). Elsewhere ci and gi represent /tʃ/ and /dʒ/ followed by /i/: cibo /ˈtʃibo/ 'food', baci /ˈbatʃi/ 'kisses'; gita /ˈdʒita/ 'trip', Tamigi /taˈmidʒi/ 'Thames'.*

The Italian alphabet is typically considered to consist of 21 letters. The letters j, k, w, x, y are traditionally excluded, though they appear in loanwords such as jeans, whisky, taxi, xenofobo, xilofono. The letter  has become common in standard Italian with the prefix extra-, although (e)stra- is traditionally used; it is also common to use the Latin particle ex(-) to mean "former(ly)" as in: la mia ex ("my ex-girlfriend"), "Ex-Jugoslavia" ("Former Yugoslavia"). The letter  appears in the first name Jacopo and in some Italian place-names, such as Bajardo, Bojano, Joppolo, Jerzu, Jesolo, Jesi, Ajaccio, among others, and in Mar Jonio, an alternative spelling of Mar Ionio (the Ionian Sea). The letter  may appear in dialectal words, but its use is discouraged in contemporary standard Italian.
 The acute accent is used over word-final  to indicate a stressed front close-mid vowel, as in perché "why, because". The grave accent is used over any vowel to indicate word-final stress, as in gioventù "youth". Unlike , which is a close-mid vowel, a stressed final  is almost always a back open-mid vowel (andrò), with a few exceptions, like metró, with a stressed final back close-mid vowel, making  for the most part unnecessary outside of dictionaries. Most of the time, the penultimate syllable is stressed. But if the stressed vowel is the final letter of the word, the accent is mandatory, otherwise it is virtually always omitted. Exceptions are typically either in dictionaries, where all or most stressed vowels are commonly marked. Accents can optionally be used to disambiguate words that differ only by stress, as for prìncipi "princes" and princìpi "principles", or àncora "anchor" and ancóra "still/yet". For monosyllabic words, the rule is different: when two orthographically identical monosyllabic words with different meanings exist, one is accented and the other is not (example: è "is", e "and").
 The letter  distinguishes ho, hai, ha, hanno (present indicative of avere "to have") from o ("or"), ai ("to the"), a ("to"), anno ("year"). In the spoken language, the letter is always silent. The letter  is also used in combinations with other letters. No phoneme  exists in Italian. For example, hotel and hovercraft are pronounced  and  respectively. (Where  existed in Latin, it either disappeared or, in a few cases before a back vowel, changed to : traggo "I pull" ← Lat. .)
 The letters  and  can symbolize voiced or voiceless consonants.  symbolizes  or  depending on context, with few minimal pairs. For example: zanzara  "mosquito" and nazione  "nation".  symbolizes  word-initially before a vowel, when clustered with a voiceless consonant, and when doubled; it symbolizes  when between vowels and when clustered with voiced consonants.
 The letters  and  vary in pronunciation between plosives and affricates depending on following vowels. The letter  symbolizes  when word-final and before the back vowels . It symbolizes  as in chair before the front vowels . The letter  symbolizes  when word-final and before the back vowels . It symbolizes  as in gem before the front vowels . Compare hard and soft C, hard and soft G. (See also palatalization.)
 The digraphs  and  indicate ( and ) before . For example:

{| class="wikitable"
!
! colspan="2" | Before back vowel (A, O, U)
! colspan="2" | Before front vowel (I, E)
|-
! rowspan="2" | Plosive
! C
| caramella  candy
! CH
| china  India ink
|-
! G
| gallo  rooster
! GH
| ghiro  edible dormouse
|-
! rowspan="2" | Affricate
! CI
| ciambella  donut
! C
| Cina  China
|-
! GI
| giallo  yellow
! G
| giro  round, tour
|}

For example, it is silent in ciao  and cielo , but it is pronounced in farmacia  and farmacie .

Italian has geminate, or double, consonants, which are distinguished by length and intensity.
Geminate plosives and affricates are realized as lengthened closures. There is only one vibrant phoneme  but the actual pronunciation depends on context and regional accent. Generally one can find a flap consonant  in unstressed position whereas  is more common in stressed syllables, but there may be exceptions.

The voiced postalveolar fricative  is present as a phoneme only in loanwords: for example, garage . Phonetic  is common in Central and Southern Italy as an intervocalic allophone of : gente  'people' but la gente  'the people', ragione  'reason'.

Grammar 

Italian grammar is typical of the grammar of Romance languages in general. Cases exist for personal pronouns (nominative, oblique, accusative, dative), but not for nouns.

There are two basic classes of nouns in Italian, referred to as genders, masculine and feminine. Gender may be natural (ragazzo 'boy', ragazza 'girl') or simply grammatical with no possible reference to biological gender (masculine costo 'cost', feminine costa 'coast'). Masculine nouns typically end in -o (ragazzo 'boy'), with plural marked by -i (ragazzi 'boys'), and feminine nouns typically end in -a, with plural marked by -e (ragazza 'girl', ragazze 'girls'). For a group composed of boys and girls, ragazzi is the plural, suggesting that -i is a general neutral plural. A third category of nouns is unmarked for gender, ending in -e in the singular and -i in the plural: legge 'law, f. sg.', leggi 'laws, f. pl.'; fiume 'river, m. sg.', fiumi 'rivers, m. pl.', thus assignment of gender is arbitrary in terms of form, enough so that terms may be identical but of distinct genders: fine meaning 'aim', 'purpose' is masculine, while fine meaning 'end, ending' (e.g. of a movie) is feminine, and both are fini in the plural, a clear instance of -i as a non-gendered default plural marker. These nouns often, but not always, denote inanimates. There are a number of nouns that have a masculine singular and a feminine plural, most commonly of the pattern m. sg. -o, f. pl. -a (miglio 'mile, m. sg.', miglia 'miles, f. pl.'; paio 'pair, m. sg., paia 'pairs, f. pl.'), and thus are sometimes considered neuter (these are usually derived from neuter Latin nouns). An instance of neuter gender also exists in pronouns of the third person singular.

Examples:

Nouns, adjectives, and articles inflect for gender and number (singular and plural).

Like in English, common nouns are capitalized when occurring at the beginning of a sentence. Unlike English, nouns referring to languages (e.g. Italian), speakers of languages, or inhabitants of an area (e.g. Italians) are not capitalized.

There are three types of adjectives: descriptive, invariable and form-changing. Descriptive adjectives are the most common, and their endings change to match the number and gender of the noun they modify. Invariable adjectives are adjectives whose endings do not change. The form changing adjectives "buono (good), bello (beautiful), grande (big), and santo (saint)" change in form when placed before different types of nouns. Italian has three degrees for comparison of adjectives: positive, comparative, and superlative.

The order of words in the phrase is relatively free compared to most European languages. The position of the verb in the phrase is highly mobile. Word order often has a lesser grammatical function in Italian than in English. Adjectives are sometimes placed before their noun and sometimes after. Subject nouns generally come before the verb. Italian is a null-subject language, so that nominative pronouns are usually absent, with subject indicated by verbal inflections (e.g. amo 'I love', ama '(s)he loves', amano 'they love'). Noun objects normally come after the verb, as do pronoun objects after imperative verbs, infinitives and gerunds, but otherwise pronoun objects come before the verb.

There are both indefinite and definite articles in Italian. There are four indefinite articles, selected by the gender of the noun they modify and by the phonological structure of the word that immediately follows the article. Uno is masculine singular, used before z ( or ), s+consonant, gn, or ps, while masculine singular un is used before a word beginning with any other sound. The noun zio 'uncle' selects masculine singular, thus uno zio 'an uncle' or uno zio anziano 'an old uncle,' but un mio zio 'an uncle of mine'. The feminine singular indefinite articles are una, used before any consonant sound, and its abbreviated form, written un', used before vowels: una camicia 'a shirt', una camicia bianca 'a white shirt', un'altra camicia 'a different shirt'. There are seven forms for definite articles, both singular and plural. In the singular: lo, which corresponds to the uses of uno; il, which corresponds to the uses with consonant of un; la, which corresponds to the uses of una; l', used for both masculine and feminine singular before vowels. In the plural: gli is the masculine plural of lo and l'; i is the plural of il; and le is the plural of feminine la and l'.

There are numerous contractions of prepositions with subsequent articles. There are numerous productive suffixes for diminutive, augmentative, pejorative, attenuating, etc., which are also used to create neologisms.

There are 27 pronouns, grouped in clitic and tonic pronouns. Personal pronouns are separated into three groups: subject, object (which take the place of both direct and indirect objects), and reflexive. Second person subject pronouns have both a polite and a familiar form. These two different types of address are very important in Italian social distinctions. All object pronouns have two forms: stressed and unstressed (clitics). Unstressed object pronouns are much more frequently used, and come before a verb conjugated for subject verb (La vedi. 'You see her.'), after (in writing, attached to) non-conjugated verbs (vedendola 'seeing her'). Stressed object pronouns come after the verb, and are used when emphasis is required, for contrast, or to avoid ambiguity (Vedo lui, ma non lei. 'I see him, but not her'). Aside from personal pronouns, Italian also has demonstrative, interrogative, possessive, and relative pronouns. There are two types of demonstrative pronouns: relatively near (this) and relatively far (that). Demonstratives in Italian are repeated before each noun, unlike in English.

There are three regular sets of verbal conjugations, and various verbs are irregularly conjugated. Within each of these sets of conjugations, there are four simple (one-word) verbal conjugations by person/number in the indicative mood (present tense; past tense with imperfective aspect, past tense with perfective aspect, and future tense), two simple conjugations in the subjunctive mood (present tense and past tense), one simple conjugation in the conditional mood, and one simple conjugation in the imperative mood. Corresponding to each of the simple conjugations, there is a compound conjugation involving a simple conjugation of "to be" or "to have" followed by a past participle. "To have" is used to form compound conjugation when the verb is transitive ("Ha detto", "ha fatto": he/she has said, he/she has made/done), while "to be" is used in the case of verbs of motion and some other intransitive verbs ("È andato", "è stato": he has gone, he has been). "To be" may be used with transitive verbs, but in such a case it makes the verb passive ("È detto", "è fatto": it is said, it is made/done). This rule is not absolute, and some exceptions do exist.

Words

Conversation
Note: the plural form of verbs could also be used as an extremely formal (for example to noble people in monarchies) singular form (see royal we).

Question words

Time

Numbers

Days of the week

Months of the year

See also 

 Languages of Italy (includes "Italian dialects") 
 Accademia della Crusca
 CELI
 CILS (Qualification)
 Enciclopedia Italiana
 Italian alphabet
 Regional Italian 
 Italian exonyms
 Italian grammar
 Italian honorifics
 List of countries and territories where Italian is an official language
 The Italian Language Foundation (in the United States)
 Italian language in Croatia
 Italian language in Slovenia
 Italian language in the United States
 Italian language in Venezuela
 Italian literature
 Italian musical terms
 Italian phonology
 Italian profanity
 Italian Sign Language
 Italian Studies
 Italian Wikipedia
 Italian-language international radio stations
 Lessico etimologico italiano
 Sicilian School
 Veronese Riddle
 Languages of the Vatican City
 Talian
 List of English words of Italian origin
 List of Italian musical terms used in English

Notes

References

Bibliography 

 
 
 
 
 
 
 
 
 M. Vitale, Studi di Storia della Lingua Italiana, LED Edizioni Universitarie, Milano, 1992, 
 S. Morgana, Capitoli di Storia Linguistica Italiana, LED Edizioni Universitarie, Milano, 2003, 
 J. Kinder, CLIC: Cultura e Lingua d'Italia in CD-ROM / Culture and Language of Italy on CD-ROM, Interlinea, Novara, 2008, 
  (with a similar list of other Italian-modern languages dictionaries)

External links 

 
 Il Nuovo De Mauro 
 
 Swadesh list in English and Italian
 Italian proverbs
 "Learn Italian", BBC

 
Fusional languages
Languages attested from the 10th century
Languages of Italy
Languages of Monaco
Languages of San Marino
Languages of Sicily
Languages of Switzerland
Languages of Vatican City
Languages of Slovenia
Languages of Croatia
Subject–verb–object languages